Five ships of the Royal Navy have borne the name HMS Foam, a figurative term for the sea:

 , a wooden  gunboat launched in 1856 and sold for breaking in 1867.
 , a composite  launched in 1871 and sold for breaking in 1887.
 , a Thornycroft two funnel, 30-knot destroyer (classified as a D-class destroyer in 1912) launched in 1896 and sold for breaking in 1914.
, an Admiralty steel drifter, launched in 1919, sold in 1921, and renamed Starwort.
, J405 a Lend-Lease  launched in 1943 and returned to the US Navy in 1946.

See also
HMS Northern Foam a 655-ton trawler hired in 1939 and returned to her owners in 1945.

References

Royal Navy ship names